Lennart Forsberg (28 March 1928 - 6 September 2020) was a Swedish footballer who played as a left winger. Forsberg debuted in 1945 at the age of 17 with GIF Sundsvall. He made 28 Allsvenskan appearances for Djurgården and scored 14 goals.

Lennart Forsberg was the father of footballer Leif Forsberg and grandfather of footballer Emil Forsberg.

References

1928 births
2020 deaths
Association football wingers
Swedish footballers
Allsvenskan players
GIF Sundsvall players
Djurgårdens IF Fotboll players